Iulotrichia is a genus of moths in the family Geometridae first described by Warren in 1894.

Species
 Iulotrichia buzurata Warren, 1894
 Iulotrichia decursaria Walker, 1860
 Iulotrichia eusciasta Prout
 Iulotrichia malescripta Warren, 1897
 Iulotrichia semialbida Warren, 1896
 Iulotrichia semiumbrata Warren, 1896

References

Boarmiini